This is a list of foreign goalscorers in the A-League Men, which commenced play in 2005. The following players must meet both of the following two criteria:
Have scored at least one A-League Men goal (including finals). Players who were signed by A-League Men clubs, but only scored in cup and/or continental games, or did not score any competitive goals at all, are not included.
Are considered foreign, i.e., outside Australia and New Zealand determined by the following:
A player is considered foreign if he is not eligible to play for the national team of Australia or New Zealand.
More specifically,
If a player has been capped on international level, the national team is used; if he has been capped by more than one country, the highest level (or the most recent) team is used. These include Australia/New Zealand players with dual citizenship.
If a player has not been capped on international level, his country of birth is used, except those who were born abroad from Australian parents or moved to Australia at a young age, and those who clearly indicated to have switched his nationality to another nation.

Players listed are those who have played at least one A-League Men game. Note that calendar years are used. This follows general practice in expressing years a player spent at club.

Statistics correct as of 28 February 2023.



Albania
 Migjen Basha — Melbourne Victory (1)

Argentina
 Fernandon Brandán — Melbourne City (3)
 Marcelo Carrusca — Adelaide United (25), Melbourne City (0), Western Sydney Wanderers (1)
 Nicolás Colazo — Melbourne City (4)
 Matías Córdoba — Perth Glory (1)
 Marcos Flores — Adelaide United (8), Melbourne Victory (4), Central Coast Mariners (3), Newcastle Jets (1)
 Jonatan Germano — Melbourne City (7)
 Juan Lescano – Brisbane Roar (6)
 Nicolas Martinez — Western Sydney Wanderers (4)
 Jerónimo Neumann — Adelaide United (16), Newcastle Jets (3)
 Patricio Perez — Central Coast Mariners (6)
 Patito Rodríguez — Newcastle Jets (1)
 Adrian Trinidad — Perth Glory (3)

Austria
 Kristijan Dobras — Melbourne Victory (2)
 Marc Janko — Sydney FC (16)
 Richard Kitzbichler — Melbourne Victory (5)

Bahrain
 Sayed Mohamed Adnan — Brisbane Roar (1)

Barbados
 Paul Ifill – Wellington Phoenix (33)

Belgium
 Ritchie De Laet — Melbourne City (7)
 Stein Huysegems — Wellington Phoenix (15)

Benin
 Rudy Gestede — Melbourne Victory (5)

Bosnia and Herzegovina
 Sulejman Krpić — Western Sydney Wanderers (2)

Brazil
 Alemão – Adelaide United (3)
 Andrezinho – Perth Glory (2)
 Bobô – Sydney FC (59)
 Bruno Cazarine — Sydney FC (17)
 Claudinho – Melbourne Victory (1)
 Cristiano – Adelaide United (11)
 Denni — Newcastle Jets (1)
 Diego – Adelaide United, Wellington Phoenix (1)
 Ney Fabiano – Melbourne Victory (6)
 Fabinho – Melbourne Victory (1), Sydney FC (0)
 Felipe – Wellington Phoenix (3)
 Gui Finkler – Melbourne Victory (20), Wellington Phoenix (7)
 Fred — Melbourne Victory (4), Wellington Phoenix (1), Melbourne Heart (3)
 Jair – Newcastle Jets (2), Central Coast Mariners (1)
 Leonardo – Newcastle Jets (1)
 Marcinho – Queensland Roar (3)
 Marco Túlio – Central Coast Mariners (4)
 Maycon – Melbourne Heart (1)
 Moresche – Central Coast Mariners (3)
 Patrick – Sydney FC (2)
 Daniel Penha – Newcastle Jets (4)
 Reinaldo — Brisbane Roar (24)
 Ricardinho – Melbourne Victory (2)
 Robson – Gold Coast United (3)
 Romário – Adelaide United (1)
 Yan Sasse — Wellington Phoenix (2)
 Sidnei – Perth Glory (6)
 Alex Terra — Melbourne Heart (7)
 Tiago – Newcastle Jets (1), Sydney FC (0)

Bulgaria
 Bozhidar Kraev — Wellington Phoenix (7)

Burundi
 Elvis Kamsoba — Melbourne Victory (6), Sydney FC (3)
 Pacifique Niyongabire — Adelaide United (1), Perth Glory (0)

Cameroon
 Olivier Boumal – Newcastle Jets (4)

Canada
 Alen Marcina – New Zealand Knights (2)
 Issey Nakajima-Farran – Brisbane Roar (4)

China
 Gao Leilei – New Zealand Knights (1), Wellington Phoenix (0)
 Ma Leilei – Newcastle Jets (1)
 Qu Shengqing – Adelaide United (8)
 Zhang Shuo – Newcastle Jets (1)
 Zhang Xiaobin – New Zealand Knights (1)

Colombia
 Milton Rodríguez – Newcastle Jets (7)

Costa Rica
 Kenny Cunningham – Wellington Phoenix (11)
 Carlos Hernández – Melbourne Victory (36), Wellington Phoenix (7)
 Jean Carlos Solórzano – Brisbane Roar (17), Melbourne Victory (0)
 Marco Ureña – Central Coast Mariners (12)

Croatia
 Dino Kresinger – Western Sydney Wanderers (2)
 Goran Paracki – Wellington Phoenix (1)
 Mateo Poljak – Western Sydney Wanderers (3), Newcastle Jets (3)
 Josip Tadić – Melbourne Heart (6)

Curaçao
 Roly Bonevacia – Wellington Phoenix (14), Western Sydney Wanderers (8)
 Dyron Daal – North Queensland Fury (7)
 Guyon Fernandez — Perth Glory (1)
 Darryl Lachman – Perth Glory (2)

Denmark
 Johan Absalonsen – Adelaide United (6)
 Ken Ilsø – Adelaide United (3)
 Michael Jakobsen – Melbourne City (1), Adelaide United (1)
 Thomas Kristensen – Brisbane Roar (6)
 Tobias Mikkelsen – Brisbane Roar (3)
 Morten Nordstrand – Newcastle Jets (7)

DR Congo
 Yeni Ngbakoto — Western Sydney Wanderers (4)

Ecuador
 Edson Montaño – Newcastle Jets (6)

England
 Charlie Austin — Brisbane Roar  (2)
 David Ball — Wellington Phoenix (15)
 Mark Beevers – Perth Glory (1)
 Michael Bridges — Sydney FC (2), Newcastle Jets (11)
 Wayne Brown — Newcastle Jets (2)
 Malik Buari — New Zealand Knights (2)
 Jacob Butterfield – Melbourne Victory (3)
 Zach Clough – Adelaide United (3)
 Terry Cooke — North Queensland Fury (1)
 John Curits — Gold Coast United (1)
 Brian Deane — Perth Glory (1)
 Matt Derbyshire – Macarthur FC (14)
 Neil Emblen — New Zealand Knights (3)
 Robbie Fowler — Perth Glory (18)
 Macaulay Gillesphey — Brisbane Roar (4)
 Chris Greenacre — Wellington Phoenix (19)
 Shayon Harrison — Melbourne City (4)
 Emile Heskey — Newcastle Jets (10)
 Gary Hooper — Wellington Phoenix (12)
 Mark Hughes — North Queensland Fury (4)
 Francis Jeffers — Newcastle Jets (2)
 Carl Jenkinson – Melbourne City (2), Newcastle Jets (0)
 Joe Keenan — Melbourne Victory (0), Adelaide United (1)
 Adam Le Fondre — Sydney FC (56)
 Joe Lolley – Sydney FC (5)
 Callum McManaman — Melbourne Victory (4)
 Joseph Mills — Perth Glory (1)
 Jordon Mutch – Western Sydney Wanderers (2), Macarthur FC (0)
 Craig Noone — Melbourne City (11), Macarthur FC (5)
 James Robinson — Melbourne Victory (1), Perth Glory (2), North Queensland Fury (0)
 Jack Rodwell – Western Sydney Wanderers (3), Sydney FC (0)
 John Sutton — Central Coast Mariners (1)
 Steven Taylor — Wellington Phoenix (3)
 Nicky Travis — Central Coast Mariners (3)
 Scott Wootton – Wellington Phoenix (2)
 Simon Yeo — New Zealand Knights (4)

Fiji
 Roy Krishna — Wellington Phoenix (51)

Finland
 Aleksandr Kokko — Newcastle Jets (1)
 Thomas Lam — Melbourne City (1)
 Juho Mäkelä — Sydney FC (3)

France
 Romain Amalfitano – Western Sydney Wanderers (2)
 Éric Bauthéac — Brisbane Roar (9)
 Florin Berenguer – Melbourne City (10)
 Damien Da Silva – Melbourne Victory (1)
 Matthieu Delpierre – Melbourne Victory (1)
 William Gallas – Perth Glory (1)
 Béni Nkololo – Central Coast Mariners (12)
 Loïc Puyo – Macarthur FC (2)
 Morgan Schneiderlin – Western Sydney Wanderers (1)

Georgia
 Bachana Arabuli – Macarthur FC (3)
 Beka Dartsmelia – Newcastle Jets (1)
 Beka Mikeltadze – Newcastle Jets (18)

Germany
 Daniel Adlung — Adelaide United (5)
 Alexander Baumjohann — Western Sydney Wanderers (3), Sydney FC (2)
 Maximilian Beister — Melbourne Victory (1)
 Thomas Broich — Brisbane Roar (21)
 Andre Gumprecht — Central Coast Mariners (3)
 André Kilian — North Queensland Fury (1)
 Alexander Meier — Western Sydney Wanderers (1)
 Nicolai Müller — Western Sydney Wanderers (7), Central Coast Mariners (2)
 Georg Niedermeier — Melbourne Victory (2)
 Jérome Polenz — Western Sydney Wanderers (2), Brisbane Roar (2)

Ghana
 Paul Ayongo – Central Coast Mariners (1)
 Lloyd Owusu — Adelaide United (1)

Greece
 Panagiotis Kone — Western United (2)
 Avraam Papadopoulos — Brisbane Roar (4)
 Savvas Siatravanis – Newcastle Jets (2)

Hungary
 György Sándor — Perth Glory (4)
 Krisztián Vadócz — Perth Glory (1)
 Richárd Vernes — Central Coast Mariners (1)

Indonesia
 Sergio van Dijk — Brisbane Roar (25), Adelaide United (25)

Iran
 Reza Ghoochannejhad — Sydney FC (1)

Iraq
 Ali Abbas — Newcastle Jets (4), Sydney FC (5), Wellington Phoenix (0)

Ireland
 Simon Cox — Western Sydney Wanderers (5)
 Sean Devine — New Zealand Knights (1)
 Damien Duff — Melbourne City (1)
 Andy Keogh — Perth Glory (59)
 Stephen Mallon — Central Coast Mariners (1)
 Aaron McEneff – Perth Glory (2)
 Billy Mehmet — Perth Glory (10)
 Liam Miller — Perth Glory (2), Brisbane Roar (3), Melbourne City (0)
 Roy O'Donovan — Central Coast Mariners (19), Newcastle Jets (31), Brisbane Roar (6)
 Jay O'Shea – Brisbane Roar (11)
 Wayne O'Sullivan  — Central Coast Mariners (1)
 Cillian Sheridan — Wellington Phoenix (1)

Israel
 Tomer Hemed — Wellington Phoenix (11), Western Sydney Wanderers (6)

Italy
 Benito Carbone — Sydney FC (2)
 Alessandro Del Piero — Sydney FC (24)
 Alessandro Diamanti — Western United (11)
 Massimo Maccarone — Brisbane Roar (9)
 Francesco Margiotta – Melbourne Victory (4)
 Andrea Migliorini — Melbourne Heart (3)
 Federico Piovaccari — Western Sydney Wanderers (2)

Ivory Coast
 Eugene Dadi — Perth Glory (10), Wellington Phoenix (5)
 Adama Traoré — Gold Coast United (3), Melbourne Victory (1), Western Sydney Wanderers (0)

Jamaica
 Adrian Mariappa – Macarthur FC (3)

Japan
 Riku Danzaki – Brisbane Roar (9)
 Cy Goddard – Central Coast Mariners (1)
 Keisuke Honda — Melbourne Victory (7)
 Hiroshi Ibusuki – Adelaide United (11)
 Tomoki Imai – Western United (1)
 Hiroyuki Ishida — Perth Glory (1)
 Masato Kudo – Brisbane Roar (1)
 Jumpei Kusukami — Western Sydney Wanderers (4)
 Kazuyoshi Miura — Sydney FC (2)
 Hirofumi Moriyasu — Sydney FC (2)
 Ryo Nagai — Perth Glory (4)
 Keijiro Ogawa – Western Sydney Wanderers (2)
 Shinji Ono — Western Sydney Wanderers (10)
 Manabu Saitō – Newcastle Jets (1)
 Yojiro Takahagi — Western Sydney Wanderers (2)

Kosovo
 Besart Berisha — Brisbane Roar (48), Melbourne Victory (68), Western United (26)
 Valon Berisha – Melbourne City (1)

Liberia
 Patrick Gerhardt — Melbourne Heart (1)

Lithuania
 Darvydas Sernas — Perth Glory (1)

Malaysia
 Brendan Gan – Sydney FC (5)

Mali
 Tongo Doumbia – Western United (1)

Malta
 John Hutchinson – Central Coast Mariners (18)
 Michael Mifsud – Melbourne Heart (1)
 Manny Muscat — Wellington Phoenix (4), Melbourne City (1)

Martinique
 Harry Novillo — Melbourne City (13)

Mexico
 Ulises Dávila — Wellington Phoenix (19), Macarthur FC (10)
 Gael Sandoval – Wellington Phoenix (6)

Netherlands
 Pascal Bosschaart — Sydney FC (1)
 Wout Brama — Central Coast Mariners (2)
 Jordy Buijs — Sydney FC (1)
 Romeo Castelen — Western Sydney Wanderers (9)
 Siem de Jong — Sydney FC (4)
 Orlando Engelaar — Melbourne Heart (5)
 Leroy George — Melbourne Victory (9)
 Youssouf Hersi — Perth Glory (8)
 Kew Jaliens — Newcastle Jets (3), Melbourne City (1)
 Peter Jungschlager — Gold Coast United (2)
 Luciano Narsingh – Sydney FC (1)
 Bobby Petta — Adelaide United (1), Sydney FC
 Maceo Rigters — Gold Coast United (4)
 Bart Schenkeveld — Melbourne City (1)
 Gerald Sibon — Melbourne Heart (7)
 Victor Sikora — Perth Glory (4)
 Bas van den Brink — Gold Coast United (4), Perth Glory (1)
 Richard van der Venne — Melbourne City (5)
 Rob Wielaert — Melbourne City (1)
 Rutger Worm — Melbourne City (2)
 Patrick Zwaanswijk — Central Coast Mariners (11)

North Macedonia
 Daniel Georgievski — Melbourne Victory (3), Newcastle Jets (1), Western Sydney Wanderers (0), Melbourne City (0)
 Mensur Kurtiši — Brisbane Roar (1)

Northern Ireland
 Aaron Hughes — Melbourne City (1)
 Terry McFlynn — Sydney FC (7)

Norway
 Kristian Opseth — Adelaide United (6)

Panama
 Abdiel Arroyo — Newcastle Jets (2)
 Yairo Yau — Sydney FC (6)

Philippines
 Iain Ramsay — Sydney FC (0), Adelaide United (11), Melbourne City (3)

Poland
 Marcin Budziński — Melbourne City (5)
 Adrian Mierzejewski — Sydney FC (13)
 Oskar Zawada — Wellington Phoenix (10)

Portugal
 Fábio Ferreira — Adelaide United (13), Central Coast Mariners (15), Sydney FC (0), Perth Glory (2)
 Roderick Miranda – Melbourne Victory (2)

Scotland
 Tom Aldred – Brisbane Roar (2)
 Grant Brebner — Melbourne Victory (6)
 Graham Dorrans – Western Sydney Wanderers (4)
 Ziggy Gordon – Central Coast Mariners (0), Western Sydney Wanderers (2)
 Simon Lynch — Queensland Roar (5)
 Ross McCormack — Melbourne City (14), Central Coast Mariners (1)
 Steven McGarry — Perth Glory (11)
 Charlie Miller — Gold Coast United (9)
 Nick Montgomery — Central Coast Mariners (3)
 Stewart Petrie — Central Coast Mariners (10)

Senegal
 Baba Diawara — Adelaide United (7)
 Jacques Faty — Sydney FC (2), Central Coast Mariners (0)
 Mickaël Tavares — Sydney FC (1), Central Coast Mariners (0)

Serbia
 Enver Alivodić — Newcastle Jets (2)
 Ranko Despotovic — Sydney FC (6)
 Miloš Dimitrijević — Sydney FC (2)
 Milan Đurić — Central Coast Mariners (5)
 Branko Jelić — Perth Glory (7)
 Andrija Kaluđerović — Brisbane Roar (5), Wellington Phoenix (9)
 Matija Ljujić — Wellington Phoenix (2)
 Nebojša Marinković — Perth Glory (15)
 Miloš Ninković — Sydney FC (35)
 Aleksandar Prijović – Western United (17)
 Miloš Trifunović — Newcastle Jets (9)

Singapore
 Safuwan Baharudin — Melbourne City (2)

Slovakia
 Filip Hološko — Sydney FC (18)
 Karol Kisel — Sydney FC (7)
 Róbert Mak — Sydney FC (5)

Slovenia
 Džengis Čavušević — Adelaide United (1)
 Robert Koren — Melbourne City (3)
 Denis Kramar — Perth Glory (1)
 Rene Krhin – Western United (1)

South Korea
 Byun Sung-hwan — Sydney FC (0), Newcastle Jets (2)
 Kim Seung-yong — Central Coast Mariners (3)
 Lee Ki-je — Newcastle Jets (2)
 Seo Hyuk-su — Brisbane Roar (2)
 Song Jin-hyung — Newcastle Jets (5)

South Sudan
 Kenny Athiu – Melbourne Victory (1)
 Abraham Majok – Western Sydney Wanderers (2), Central Coast Mariners (0)
 Valentino Yuel – Western United (0), Newcastle Jets (10)

Spain
 Alberto — Western Sydney Wanderers (1)
 Andreu — Western Sydney Wanderers (3), Perth Glory (0)
 Asdrúbal — Central Coast Mariners (2)
 Raúl Baena — Melbourne Victory (1)
 Alan Baró — Melbourne Victory (0), Central Coast Mariners (1)
 Aritz Borda — Western Sydney Wanderers (1)
 Diego Caballo — Sydney FC (1)
 Cadete — Melbourne Victory (1)
 Diego Castro — Perth Glory (49)
 Álvaro Cejudo — Western Sydney Wanderers (2)
 Sergio Cirio — Adelaide United (20)
 Corona — Brisbane Roar (2)
 Dimas — Western Sydney Wanderers (3)
 Luis García — Central Coast Mariners (2)
 Sergi Guardiola — Adelaide United (3)
 Iker Guarrotxena – Western United (3)
 Juande — Perth Glory (2), Adelaide United (1)
 Álex López — Brisbane Roar (3)
 Javi López — Adelaide United (3)
 Mandi — Wellington Phoenix (2)
 Miguel Palanca — Adelaide United (1)
 Oriol Riera — Western Sydney Wanderers (25)
 Alex Rodriguez — Wellington Phoenix (1)
 Dani Sánchez — Wellington Phoenix (1)
 Pablo Sánchez — Adelaide United (17)
 Víctor Sánchez – Western United (3)
 Markel Susaeta — Melbourne City (2), Macarthur FC (5)
 Xavi Torres — Perth Glory (4)
 David Villa — Melbourne City (2)

Sweden
 Ola Toivonen — Melbourne Victory (23)

Switzerland
 Stephan Keller — Sydney FC (1)
 Léo Lacroix — Western United (3)
 Gregory Wüthrich — Perth Glory (1)

Trinidad and Tobago
 Dwight Yorke — Sydney FC (7)

Tunisia
 Fahid Ben Khalfallah — Melbourne Victory (12), Brisbane Roar (1)
 Amor Layouni – Western Sydney Wanderers (1)
 Salim Khelifi – Perth Glory (2)

Turkey
 Jem Karacan — Central Coast Mariners (1)

Uganda
 Eugene Sseppuya – North Queensland Fury (1)

United States
 Tyler Boyd – Wellington Phoenix (4)
 Alex Smith — Gold Coast United (0), Wellington Phoenix (1)

Uruguay
 Javier Cabrera — Melbourne City (1)
 Adrián Luna — Melbourne City (8)

Vanuatu
 Mitch Cooper – Gold Coast United (1), Newcastle Jets (1)

Venezuela
 Ronald Vargas — Newcastle Jets (5)

Wales
 Aaron Amadi-Holloway — Brisbane Roar (1)

See also
 A-League Men records and statistics
 List of foreign A-League Men players

Notes

References
General

Australia
A-League Men records and statistics
A-League Men lists
Association football player non-biographical articles